João Assis (born July 11, 1983), is a Brazilian Brazilian Jiu-Jitsu practitioner and a former mixed martial artist. Assis is a World No-Gi Champion and an ADCC Gold and Silver medalist.
João became the 2013 ADCC Submission Grappling World Champion by defeating Dean Lister in the finals.

Bio
Joao Francisco de Moraes Assis is Brazilian Brazilian Jiu-Jitsu black belt under Leonardo Vieira

Main Achievements
Assis won the following titles:

ADCC Champion (2013)
World Nogi Champion (2015, 2010)
World Champion (2007 – purple belt division)
World Cup Champion (2007 – open weight division, purple belt – CBJJE)
Pan American Champion (2009 – open weight, brown belt division)
10x Grapplers Quest Champion
2x NAGA Champion – NO GI advanced (2009 weight and open weight)
2x NAGA Champion – Jiu Jitsu (2009 weight and open weight)
2008 World NO GI Champion (2008 – brown belt division)
4x American National Champion
California State Champion (2009 – open weight)
ADCC Silver Medallist (2011)

Mixed martial arts record
Fights record

|-
| Loss
| align=center| 5-6 (1)
| Lorenz Larkin
| KO (Slam)
| Respect In The Cage 10
| 
| align=center| 1
| align=center| 1:43
| Los Angeles, California, United States
| 
|-
| Loss
| align=center| 5-5 (1)
| Gerson Cordeiro
| KO (Punches)
| M-1 Challenge 19: 2009 Semifinals
| 
| align=center| 1
| align=center| 3:50
| Rustov Oblast, Russia
| 
|-
| Loss
| align=center| 5-4 (1)
| Augusto Montano
| TKO (Punches)
| Total Combat 33
| 
| align=center| 1
| align=center| 4:43
| Mexico City, Mexico
| 
|-
| Loss
| align=center| 5-3 (1)
| Luiz Cane
| TKO (Punches)
| Fury FC 2 - Final Combat
| 
| align=center| 1
| align=center| 3:41
| São Paulo, Brazil
| 
|-
| Loss
| align=center| 5-2 (1)
| Victor Vianna
| KO (Punches)
| Fury FC 1 - Warlords Unleashed
| 
| align=center| 1
| align=center| 1:57
| São Paulo, Brazil
| 
|-
| Win
| align=center| 5-1 (1)
| Jaguar Jaguar
| KO (Punch)
| Portugal Vale Tudo 2
| 
| align=center| 1
| align=center| n/a
| Lisbon, Portugal
| 
|-
| NC
| align=center| 4-1 (1)
| Jalison Silva Santos
| No Contest
| Clube Da Luta 4
| 
| align=center| 1
| align=center| 4:43
| Salvador, Bahia, Bahia, Brazil
| 
|-
| Win
| align=center| 4-1
| Marlo Senck
| Submission (rear naked choke)
| Profight Championships 4
| 
| align=center| 1
| align=center| 3:28
| Porto Alegre, Rio Grande do Sul, Brazil
| 
|-
| Loss
| align=center| 3-1
| Helio Dipp
| KO (Punch)
| Storm Samurai 6
| 
| align=center| 1
| align=center| 2:56
| Curitiba, Paraná, Brazil
| 
|-
| Win
| align=center| 3-0
| Edinelson Nelsão
| Submission (kimura)
| Clube da Luta 2
| 
| align=center| 1
| align=center| 2:10
| Salvador, Bahia, Bahia, Brazil
| 
|-
| Win
| align=center| 2-0
| Roberto Piazza
| TKO (punches)
| Profight Championship 3
| 
| align=center| 1
| align=center| 0:40
| Porto Alegre, Rio Grande do Sul, Brazil
| 
|-
| Win
| align=center| 1-0
| Valdir Linhares
| Submission (rear-naked choke)
| Profight Combat Show
| 
| align=center| 3
| align=center| 4:03
| Porto Alegre, Rio Grande do Sul, Brazil
|

References

Sources 
 bjjheroes
 sherdog

Living people
Brazilian practitioners of Brazilian jiu-jitsu
Brazilian male mixed martial artists
Mixed martial artists utilizing Brazilian jiu-jitsu
1983 births
World No-Gi Brazilian Jiu-Jitsu Championship medalists
Sportspeople from Porto Alegre